R. O. Kwon is a South-Korean-born American author. In 2018, she published her nationally bestselling debut novel The Incendiaries with Riverhead Books, an imprint of Penguin Random House.

Early life
Kwon was born in Seoul, South Korea, and moved to Los Angeles with her family when she was three. She was raised in a Christian household but at the age of 17 experienced a crisis of faith and stopped believing in God.

She attended Yale University. She has a Master of Fine Arts from Brooklyn College.

Career
Kwon's work has appeared in publications including The New York Times, The Guardian, The Paris Review, BuzzFeed, Vice, New York Magazine's The Cut, and elsewhere. She has received fellowships from the National Endowment for the Arts, Yaddo, and MacDowell.

In 2018, Kwon published her debut novel, The Incendiaries, about a woman who becomes involved with a cult of extremist Christians. The novel was inspired by Kwon's own loss of faith in God, and it took her 10 years to finish. The Incendiaries was named a best book of the year by over 40 publications and organizations, including the Today Show, NPR, BuzzFeed, The Atlantic, PBS Books, Entertainment Weekly, Vulture, and elsewhere, and it is being translated into seven languages. Before the book's release, Kwon was called one of "4 writers to watch" by The New York Times. The Incendiaries is an American Booksellers Association Indie Next #1 Great Read and an American Booksellers Association Indies Introduce Pick. The novel received the Housatonic Book Prize, and was a finalist for the National Book Critics Circle John Leonard Award for Best First Book, Los Angeles Times First Book Prize, and Northern California Independent Booksellers Association Fiction Prize. In addition, the book has been nominated for the American Library Association Carnegie Medal and Aspen Prize.

Her second book, Kink, an anthology Kwon co-edited with Garth Greenwell, was released in February 2021.

Personal life
In November 2018 Kwon revealed that she is bisexual. The initials in her name stand for Reese, her English name, and Okyong, her Korean name.

References

External links
 

21st-century American novelists
Living people
21st-century American women writers
Year of birth missing (living people)
Brooklyn College alumni
Yale University alumni
South Korean LGBT novelists
American LGBT people of Asian descent
American LGBT novelists
Bisexual women
Bisexual novelists
American writers of Korean descent
People from Seoul
South Korean emigrants to the United States
American bisexual writers
South Korean bisexual people